Elimia potosiensis, common name the pyramid elimia, is a species of freshwater snail with an operculum, an aquatic gastropod mollusk in the family Pleuroceridae.

Subspecies
There are four subspecies:
 Elimia potosiensis potosiensis (I. Lea, 1841)
 Elimia potosiensis crandalli (Pilsbry, 1890)
 Elimia potosiensis ozarkensis (Call, 1886)
 Elimia potosiensis plebeius (Gould, 1851)

Shell description 

There is a phenotypic plasticity of shells of Elimia potosiensis:

Distribution 
Elimia potosiensis is native to the United States. It occurs in Arkansas, Kansas, Missouri and in Oklahoma.

Ecology

Habitat 
This snail is found in freshwater springs, streams and rivers.

References

Further reading 
 Branson B. A. (1971). "Variation in the shell Mudalia potosiensis (Lea) (Pleuroceridae) from a single locality". The Nautilus 85(1): 26-30.
 Jones W. C. Jr. & Branley A. B. (1964). "The radula, genital system, and external morphology in Mudalia potosiensis (Lea) 1841 (Gastropoda: Prosobranchiata: Pleuroceridae) with life history notes". Transactions of the American Microscopical Society 83(1): 41–62. JSTOR.
 Minton R. L., Lewis E. M., Netherland B. & Hayes D. M. (2011). "Large Differences over Small Distances: Plasticity in the Shells of Elimia potosiensis (Gastropoda: Pleuroceridae)". International Journal of Biology 3(1): 23–32.

potosiensis
Gastropods described in 1841